The National Informatics Centre (NIC) is an Indian government department under the Ministry of Electronics and Information Technology (MeitY). The NIC provides infrastructure, IT Consultancy, IT Services including but not limited to architecting, design, development and implementation of IT Systems to Central Government Departments and State Governments thus enabling delivery of government services to Citizens and pioneering the initiatives of Digital India.

History
The National Informatics Centre (NIC) was established in 1976 by Narasimaiah Seshagiri under the Electonics Commission of India and later moved under the Planning Commission of India before coming under the Ministry of Electronics and Information Technology (MeitY - Hindi: इलेक्ट्रॉनिकी और सूचना प्रौद्योगिकी मंत्रालय). Additional Secretary Narasimaiah Seshagiri was the first to introduce a network system in India called NICNET.
It is the technology partner of the Government of India and has been credited for helping the Indian government embrace IT in the 1990s and has also helped disseminate e-governance to the masses.

Most of this is spent in free services to various Government Departments.

In May 2019, the government of India set up the Centre for Smart Governance (CSG), and state governments have since been advised to consult the CSG for IT projects they previously would have consulted the NIC and private firms for. Some claim that government sources have said "NIC is said to be unable to scale up", though the fact is that some vested interests want to curtail role of NIC in Indian IT arena and Rajeev Chawla, Additional Chief Secretary (e-Governance), was quoted as saying "CSG will be an analogue to NIC".

Infrastructure
National Informatics Centre Services include:
 Government Local Area Networks (LANs)
 Video Conferencing
 National Knowledge Network (NKN)
 Email & Messaging
 Remote Sensing & GIS
 Webcast
 Domain Registration
 National Cloud
 Command and Control 
 NICNET
 Data Centre
 Security
 Block Chain Technology

NIC's Network, "NICNET", facilitates the institutional linkages with the Ministries/Departments of the Central Government, state Governments and District administrations of India. NIC is noted for being the primary constructor of e-Government applications. It also manages the National Knowledge Network.

Data Centers and Offices

In 2018, NIC opened its fourth data center in Bhubaneshwar to complement its existing data centers in New Delhi, Hyderabad and Pune. In addition to the national data centres ,NIC has State Centres in 36 states and Union territories. This is supplemented by 708 district offices.

National Portal of India
NIC maintains the National Portal of India. The portal contains the Constitution of India, and has a design objective to a single point to access the information and services of the Government of India.

References

Sources
 
 
 
 
 
 
 </ref>

External links
 

 
Ministry of Communications and Information Technology (India)
E-government in India
Government agencies established in 1976
1976 establishments in India